

Saki (1870–1916) was the pen name of Edwardian satirist H. H. Munro.

Saki may also refer to:

People
Saki (given name), female Japanese given name
Saki (musician)
Saki (wrestler)

Places
Saki, Azerbaijan
Saki, Bielsk County in Podlaskie Voivodeship (north-east Poland)
Saki, Gmina Kleszczele in Podlaskie Voivodeship (north-east Poland)
Saki, Gmina Narew in Podlaskie Voivodeship (north-east Poland)
Saki, India, village within greater Bombay
Saki, Nigeria, a town situated in Oyo State
Saki, Estonia, village in Rõuge Parish, Võru County
Saki-ye Olya, a village in Markazi Province, Iran
Saki-ye Sofla, a village in Markazi Province, Iran
Saky, a town in Crimea
Saky (air base), naval airbase in Crimea

Animals
Bearded saki, genus of New World monkey, Chiropotes
Saki monkey, genus of New World monkey, Pithecia

Arts, entertainment, and media
Saki (TV series), a 1962 British anthology television series based on the British writer's works
Saki (film), a 2017 live-action film based on the manga series
Saki (manga), a manga and anime series by Ritz Kobayashi
Saki Amamiya, the male protagonist in the Nintendo 64 video game Sin and Punishment

Other uses
Saki Corporation, a Japanese electronics assembly machines company
Maia language or Saki language, spoken in Madang Province, Papua New Guinea

See also
Sake (disambiguation)
Saqi (disambiguation)